The C. Wright Mills Award is a distinction awarded annually by the Society for the Study of Social Problems to the author of the book that "best exemplifies outstanding social science research and a great understanding the individual and society in the tradition of the distinguished sociologist, C. Wright Mills."

Recipients

See also

 List of social sciences awards

References

Social sciences
Social sciences awards